Paul Vandenberghe (1912–1961) was a French actor, screenwriter and playwright. He also co-directed two films.

Selected filmography
 My First Love (1945)
 Gringalet (1946)
 Not So Stupid (1946)
 The Heart on the Sleeve (1948)
 Mademoiselle Josette, My Woman (1950)
 The Last Robin Hood (1953)

References

Bibliography
 Goble, Alan. The Complete Index to Literary Sources in Film. Walter de Gruyter, 1999.

External links

1912 births
1961 deaths
French male film actors
French dramatists and playwrights
French screenwriters
French film directors
Actors from Rouen
20th-century French screenwriters
Film people from Rouen